Leucanopsis manana is a moth of the subfamily Arctiinae. It was described by Schaus in 1941. It is found in Brazil.

References

manana
Moths described in 1941